is a district located in Osaka Prefecture, Japan.

As of 2009, the district has an estimated population of 17,659 and a density of 4,380 persons per km2. The total area is 4.03 km2.

Shrines
Mitami Shrine

Town
Tadaoka

Districts in Osaka Prefecture